Soita Shitanda (9 November 1959 – 24 May 2016) was a Kenyan politician. He belonged to New Ford Kenya and was elected to represent the Malava Constituency in the National Assembly of Kenya. Soita represented Malava constituency since 1997, after he ousted the then, Minister of Health, Mr. Joshua Angatia in the general election, vying on a Ford Kenya ticket. He was re-elected to parliament in 2002 on the NARC ticket and served as an assistant minister in the office of the president, before he was appointed minister for housing in a cabinet reshuffle in 2005. Mr. Soita was again re-elected in the  2007 parliamentary election and re-appointed Minister for Housing. 
He died on the afternoon of 24 May 2016 at The Nairobi Hospital.

References

2016 deaths
1959 births
Kenyan Luhya people
Members of the National Assembly (Kenya)
Government ministers of Kenya